United Nations Security Council Resolution 365, adopted on 13 December 1974, after receiving General Assembly resolution 3212 (which regarded the Cyprus Question) and noting with satisfaction in unanimous adoption the Council endorsed the General Assembly resolution and urges the parties concerned to implement it as soon as possible, requesting the Secretary-General to report on the progress of the implementation of this resolution.

No details of the voting were given, the resolution states it was adopted "by consensus".

See also
 Cyprus dispute
 List of United Nations Security Council Resolutions 301 to 400 (1971–1976)
 Turkish Invasion of Cyprus

References
Text of the Resolution at undocs.org

External links
 

 0365
 0365
December 1974 events